Miss Europe 2002, was the 55th edition of the Miss Europe pageant and the 44th & final edition under the Mondial Events Organization. After this edition Mr. Roger Zeigler (owner of the pageant and Mondial Events Organization) sold the pageant to Endemol France (the French branch of the Dutch company Endemol). This years pageant was held at the Beirut International Exhibition & Leisure Center in Beirut, Lebanon on December 28, 2002. Svetlana Koroleva, Miss Russia, was crowned Miss Europe 2002 by outgoing titleholder Elodie Gossuin of France.

Results

Placements

Special awards

Historical significance
 Countries that also made into the top 15 previous year were France, Greece, Poland, Russia, Turkey and Ukraine.
 Belarus last placed in 1999.
 Cyprus placed for the first time.
 Holland last placed in 1993.

Contestants

Albania – Anjeza Maja
Armenia – Anna Abrahamyan
Austria – Nicole Kern
Belarus – Ol'ga Nevdakh
Belgium – Sundus Madhloom
Bosnia and Herzegovina – Branka Cvijanovic
Bulgaria – Svelina Stoyanova
Croatia – Ivana Cernok
Cyprus – Valentina Christofourou
Czech Republic – Radka Kocurová
Denmark – Tina Christensen
Estonia – Svetlana Makaritseva
Finland – Katariina Kulve
France – Louise Prieto
Georgia – Natalia Marikoda
Germany – Natascha Börger
United Kingdom – Yana Booth
Greece – Georgia Miha
Holland – Kim Kötter
Hungary – Edit Fried
Iceland – Berglind Óskarsdóttir
Latvia – Zanda Zarina
Lithuania – Raimanda Vlinciute
Malta –  Tiziana Mifsud
Republic of Moldova – Elena Streapunina
Norway – Fay Larsen
Poland – Monika Angermann
Romania – Adina Dimitru
Russia – Svetlana Koroleva
San Marino – Melania Astolfi
Slovakia – Hnana Burianova
Spain – Gemma Ruiz Garcia
Turkey – Esra Eron
Ukraine – Kataryna Kambova
Serbia and Montenegro – Olga Bozovic

"Comité Officiel et International Miss Europe" Competition

From 1951 to 2002 there was a rival Miss Europe competition organized by the "Comité Officiel et International Miss Europe". This was founded in 1950 by Jean Raibaut in Paris, the headquarters later moved to Marseille. The winners wore different titles like Miss Europe, Miss Europa or Miss Europe International.

For the last time ever, the competition took place at the Roma Musical Theatre in Warsaw, Poland. There were 48 contestants from 31 countries. At the end, Amandine Hatzithomas of Greece was crowned as Miss Europa 2002 making her the last ever Miss Europa ever. Hatzithomas succeeded predecessor Anna Maria Tudorache of Romania.

Placements

Contestants

Albania – Denisa Cela
Albania – Elisabeta Gjonpali
Andorra – Vanessa Baudet
Armenia – Florina Curelea
Armenia – Liliana Vitan
Austria – Caroline Gudonius
Belgium – Brunhilde Verhenne
Bulgaria – Alten Alieva
Bulgaria – Veneta Harizanova
Cyprus – Marianna Simeou
Denmark – Maria Farch Kristensen
Denmark – Renée Nielsson
England – Emma O’Regan
Finland – Linda Lillbäck
Finland – Sanna Ojamaa
France – Amandine Guyot
France – Jessica Laberterie
Germany – Anna Werner
Germany – Johanna Mitterer
Greece – Amandine Hatzithomas
Netherlands – Danielle van Kreuningen
Netherlands – Linda van der Hilst
Hungary – Anita Gaal
Hungary – Szabina Stedra
Ireland – Jayne Louise Slater
Italy – Barbara Salvati
Italy – Emiliana De Pasquale
 – Dielliza Banjaku
 – Dielliza Kolgeci
Latvia – Sarmite Barsevska
Macedonia – Bekime Sadiku
Malta – Antonella Vella
Malta – Mae Elizabeth Apap
Republic of Moldova – Alice Marcu
Republic of Moldova – Michaela Panait
Norway – Nadia Tavakolzadeh
Poland – Anna Baltrukiewicz
Poland – Katarzyna Starska
Poland – Malgorzata Ksiazek
Romania – Patricia Dumitrescu
Romania – Roxana Dorobantu
Scotland – Katie Craven
Spain – Esther Colado
Spain – Rebeca Castillo Castillo
Sweden – Frida Lundell
Switzerland – Stefanie Sultzer
Turkey – Cennet Erol
Wales – Kimberleigh Bates

References

Miss Europe
2002 beauty pageants
2002 in Poland
2002 in Lebanon